False Greta (Swedish: Falska Greta) is a 1934 Finnish-Swedish comedy film directed by John W. Brunius and Pauline Brunius and starring Adolf Jahr, Karin Albihn and Isa Quensel. It was shot at studios in Helsinki and on location in Stockholm. It is now considered to be a lost film.

Synopsis
Greta Gustafsson, a young typist, wins a prize in a competition and heads out to a fashionable seaside resort. She is mistaken for the Hollywood star Greta Garbo who it has been announced is returning to her native Sweden to spend her holiday incognito.

Cast
 Adolf Jahr as Ove Häger
 Karin Albihn as 	Greta Gustafsson
 Karl-Ewert Christenson as 	Count Axel von Rexdorff
 Isa Quensel as Lisa
 Mok Björnson-Langen as 	Mrs. Eva Bromeé
 Sigge Fürst as Karlsson
 Sven Relander as Mr. Grönroos
 Agnes Lindh as Mrs. Lalla Grönroos
 May Pihlgren as 	Miss Singoalla Grönroos
 John W. Brunius as 	Habercorn
 Georg Rydeberg as 	A man

References

Bibliography 
 Sadoul, Georges. Dictionary of Film Makers. University of California Press, 1972.

External links 
 

1934 films
1934 comedy films
Swedish comedy films
Finnish comedy films
1930s Swedish-language films
Swedish black-and-white films
Films directed by John W. Brunius
1930s Swedish films